The Taipei Main Public Library is the central library of Taipei City, Taiwan. It is the main library of the Taipei Public Library System. The building is located in Jianguo South Road, Da'an District, near the Daan Forest Park.

Floor Plan

Organization 
 Director
 Deputy Director
 Chief Secretary
 Acquisition and Cataloging Section
Circulation & Preservation Section
 Reference Services Section
 Extension Section
 Audiovisual Section
Systems Administration Office
 Administration Office
 Personnel Office
 Accounting Office
Government Ethics Office

References

External links

Taipei Public Library Official Website (English version)

1990 establishments in Taiwan
Buildings and structures in Taipei
Education in Taipei
Public libraries in Taiwan
Libraries in Taipei